Podolobium alpestre, commonly known as alpine shaggy-pea, is a flowering plant in the family Fabaceae and is endemic  to south-eastern Australia. It has oblong to egg-shaped leaves and yellow to orange pea-like flowers with red markings.

Description

Taxonomy and naming
Podolobium alpestre  was first formally described 1855 by Ferdinand von Mueller and the description was published in Definitions of rare or hitherto undescribed Australian Plants, chiefly collected within the boundaries of the colony of Victoria. Mueller gave it the name Oxylobium alpestre. The species was transferred to the genus Podolobium in 1995.

Distribution and habitat
Alpine shaggy-pea occurs in alpine heaths and high-altitude woodland in Victoria, New South Wales and the Australian Capital Territory.

References

External links
Herbarium specimen at Royal Botanic Gardens Kew

Fabales of Australia
Flora of the Australian Capital Territory
Flora of New South Wales
Flora of Victoria (Australia)
alpestre
Plants described in 1855
Taxa named by Ferdinand von Mueller